Hermann Broch (1 November 1886 – 30 May 1951) was an Austrian writer, best known for two major works of modernist fiction: The Sleepwalkers (Die Schlafwandler, 1930–32) and The Death of Virgil (Der Tod des Vergil, 1945).

Life
Broch was born in Vienna, Austria-Hungary, to a prosperous Jewish family and worked for some time in his family's factory, though he maintained his literary interests privately. As the oldest son, he was expected to take over his father’s textile factory in Teesdorf; therefore, he attended a technical college for textile manufacture and a spinning and weaving college.

In 1909 he converted to Roman Catholicism and married Franziska von Rothermann, the daughter of a knighted manufacturer. The following year, their son Hermann Friedrich Maria was born. His marriage ended in divorce in 1923. In 1927 he sold the textile factory and decided to study mathematics, philosophy and psychology at the University of Vienna. He embarked on a full-time literary career around the age of 40. At the age of 45, his first major literary work, the trilogy The Sleepwalkers, was published by Daniel Brody for the Rhein Verlag in Munich in three volumes from 1930 to 1932.

He was acquainted with many of the writers, intellectuals, and artists of his time, including Robert Musil, Rainer Maria Rilke, Elias Canetti, Leo Perutz, Franz Blei and writer and former nude model Ea von Allesch. 

After the annexation of Austria by the Nazis on 12 March 1938, Broch was arrested in the small Alpine town of Bad Aussee for possession of a socialist magazine and detained in the district jail from the 13th to the 31st of March. Shortly thereafter, a movement organized by friends – including James Joyce, Thornton Wilder, and his translators Edwin and Willa Muir – managed to help him emigrate; first to Britain and then to the United States, where he published his novel The Death of Virgil and his collection of short stories The Guiltless. While in exile, he also continued to write on politics and work on mass psychology, similar to Elias Canetti and Hannah Arendt. His essay on mass behaviour remained unfinished. Broch's work on mass psychology was intended to form part of more ambitious project to defend democracy, human rights, and human dignity as irreducible ethical absolutes in a postreligious age. 

From the 15th of August to the 15th of September 1939, Hermann Broch lived at the Albert Einstein House at 112 Mercer Street Princeton, New Jersey when the Einsteins were on vacation. From 1942 to 1948 Broch lived in an attic apartment in Eric and Lili Kahler's house at One Evelyn Place in Princeton, New Jersey. Broch died in 1951 in New Haven, Connecticut. He is buried in Killingworth, Connecticut, in the cemetery on Roast Meat Hill Road. He was nominated for the Nobel Prize in Literature in 1950.

Work
Broch's first major literary work was the trilogy The Sleepwalkers (Die Schlafwandler), published in three volumes from 1930 to 1932. Broch takes "the degeneration of values" as his theme. The trilogy has been praised by Milan Kundera, whose writing has been greatly influenced by Broch.

One of his foremost works, The Death of Virgil (Der Tod des Vergil) was first published in June 1945 in both its English translation and original German. Having begun the text as a short radio lecture in 1937, Broch expanded and redeveloped the text over the next eight years of his life, which witnessed a short incarceration in an Austrian prison after the Austrian Anschluss, his flight to Scotland via England, and his eventual exile in the United States. This extensive, difficult novel interweaves reality, hallucination, poetry and prose, and reenacts the last 18 hours of the Roman poet Virgil's life in the port of Brundisium (Brindisi). Here, shocked by the balefulness (Unheil) of the society he glorifies in his Aeneid, the feverish Virgil resolves to burn his epic, but is thwarted by his close friend and emperor Augustus before he succumbs to his fatal ailment. The final chapter exhibits the  final hallucinations of the poet, where Virgil voyages to a distant land at which he witnesses roughly the biblical creation story in reverse.

Broch's final published work before he died was The Guiltless (Die Schuldlosen, 1950), a collection of stories.

Broch demonstrates mastery of a wide range of styles, from the gentle parody of Theodor Fontane in the first volume of The Sleepwalkers through the essayistic segments of the third volume to the dithyrambic phantasmagoria of The Death of Virgil.

Selected bibliography
 Die Schlafwandler. Eine Romantrilogie (1930–32). The Sleepwalkers: A Trilogy, trans. by Edwin and Willa Muir (1932).
Pasenow; oder, Die Romantik – 1888 (1930). Part One: The Romantic.
Esch; oder, Die Anarchie – 1903 (1931). Part Two: The Anarchist.
Huguenau, oder, Die Sachlichkeit – 1918 (1932). Part Three: The Realist.
 Die unbekannte Größe (1933). The Unknown Quantity, trans. by Edwin and Willa Muir (1935).
 Der Tod des Vergil (1945). The Death of Virgil, trans. by Jean Starr Untermeyer (1945).
 Die Schuldlosen (1950). The Guiltless, trans. by Ralph Manheim (1974).
 Short Stories (1966), edited by E. W. Herd, introduction in English, text in German. Includes: "Verlorener Sohn"; "Eine leichte Enttäuschung"; "Der Meeresspiegel"; and "Die Heimkehr des Vergil".
 Hofmannsthal und seine Zeit (1974). Hugo von Hofmannsthal and His Time, trans. by Michael P. Steinberg (1984).
 Die Verzauberung (1976). The Spell, trans. by Hermann Broch de Rothermann (1987).
 Geist and Zeitgeist: The Spirit in an Unspiritual Age (2002). Six essays translated by John Hargraves.

Complete works in German: Kommentierte Werkausgabe, ed. Paul Michael Lützeler. Frankfurt am Main: Suhrkamp, 1974–1981.

 KW 1: Die Schlafwandler. Eine Romantrilogie
 KW 2: Die unbekannte Größe. Roman
 KW 3: Die Verzauberung. Roman
 KW 4: Der Tod des Vergil. Roman
 KW 5: Die Schuldlosen. Roman in elf Erzählungen
 KW 6: Novellen
 KW 7: Dramen
 KW 8: Gedichte
 KW 9/ 1+2: Schriften zur Literatur
 KW 10/ 1+2: Philosophische Schriften
 KW 11: Politische Schriften
 KW 12: Massenwahntheorie
 KW 13/ 1+2+3: Briefe.

See also
 Exilliteratur

Notes

References

Further reading
Graham Bartram, Sarah McGaughey, and Galin Tihanov, ed. A Companion to the Works of Hermann Broch. Camden House: Rochester, NY, 2019.  
Michael Kessler and Paul Michael Lützeler, ed. Hermann-Broch-Handbuch. DeGruyter: Berlin and Boston, 2015.

External links
 
 IN SEARCH OF THE ABSOLUTE NOVEL – 1985 review of The Sleepwalkers by Theodore Ziolkowski
 Hermann Broch archive at Yale University
 The Sleepwalkers at The Complete Review
 Geist and Zeitgeist at The Complete Review 
 Death of Virgil at The Complete Review
 A personal page about Broch's writings, and about Broch's son, H.F. Broch de Rothermann
 IAB, an international group of scholars working on Hermann Broch, with biography, bibliography, and links
 H. F. Broch de Rothermann Papers. Yale Collection of German Literature, Beinecke Rare Book and Manuscript Library.

1886 births
1951 deaths
Writers from Vienna
Jewish emigrants from Austria to the United States after the Anschluss
Jewish Austrian writers
Modernist writers
Converts to Roman Catholicism from Judaism
Austrian Roman Catholics
Exilliteratur writers
Analysands of Paul Federn
German male writers
German-language poets
20th-century Austrian writers